Rauf Jabbarov (July 8, 1935 – May 11, 2010) was an Azerbaijani boxing manager and trainer who handled the careers of Ali Ismailov, Rovshan Huseynov, Rashad Ismailov and Vugar Alakbarov.

Biography
Jabbarov was born in Bilgəh, Baku, Azerbaijan and worked nearly most of his career in Dynamo gym. In 1966, he was appointed as head coach of Azerbaijan national boxing team and worked there for 35 years, until his retirement in 2001 following heart attack.

In 1995, he was awarded Taraqqi medal by Heydar Aliyev.

Death
On 11 May 2010, Jabbarov died in Bilgəh, Baku, Azerbaijan, after having second heart attack.

References

1943 births
2010 deaths
Boxing trainers
Sportspeople from Baku